Gary Chalk (born 1952) is an English illustrator and model-maker.

Biography
A native of rural Hertfordshire, Chalk began playing wargames at the age of fifteen. He took a BA in design and worked as a teacher of art and design before going freelance.

Chalk is perhaps best known for his contributions to the Lone Wolf series of gamebooks written by Joe Dever. In addition to Lone Wolf, Gary has been involved in the artwork for a number of other notable games and books. These include the board game Talisman, and the first six volumes of the Redwall series of children's books. He has also drawn maps for the entire selection of Warriors books by Erin Hunter.

Chalk and Ian Bailey created the game Fantasy Warlord (1990) to attempt to compete with Games Workshop's Warhammer Fantasy Battle.

In 2009–2010, Chalk illustrated Allan Frewin Jones' Sundered Lands books. He is also illustrating with original artworks the French edition of Mongoose Publishing's Lone Wolf RPG. Chalk was one of the illustrators of The Secret History of Giants (2008), by Ari Berk.

Other games 
 Battlecars and the expansion Battlebikes
 Cry Havoc
 Curse of the Mummy's Tomb
 Fantasy Warlord
 Cadwallon
 Devil Kings
 HeroQuest (Cards and Rulebook)
 Terror of the Lichemaster

References

External links 
Gary Chalk official website 

1952 births
English illustrators
British speculative fiction artists
Fantasy artists
Games Workshop artists
Living people
Lone Wolf (gamebooks)
People from Hertfordshire
Role-playing game artists
Date of birth missing (living people)